Elena Stonaker is an American fine artist and designer who lives and works in Los Angeles. She is known for her intricate textile work and  soft sculpture installations created upon myth-based narratives.

References

External links 
  (Official Website)

1985 births
Living people
21st-century American women artists
Contemporary sculptors
American conceptual artists
Women conceptual artists
Wearable art
American fashion designers
American women fashion designers
Artists from Los Angeles